Michael Green (born 14 May 1948) is a former Australian rules football player who played in the Victorian Football League (VFL) between 1966 and 1971 and then again between 1973 and 1975 for the Richmond Football Club.

The demands of a law career, which caused him to retire temporarily in 1972, before returning and playing in back to back flags in 1973 and 1974.

Green is now well known in the Melbourne legal community. Until 2018 before retiring, he ran Greens List, one of the Victoria's largest barristers' clerk services.

Green is grandfather to current GWS AFL player Tom Green & second cousin to current Port Adelaide AFL player Xavier Duursma.

References 

 Hogan P: The Tigers Of Old, Richmond FC, Melbourne 1996
 Richmond Football Club – Hall of Fame

External links
 
 

Living people
1948 births
Richmond Football Club players
Richmond Football Club Premiership players
Old Xaverians Football Club players
Australian rules footballers from Victoria (Australia)
Four-time VFL/AFL Premiership players
Australian lawyers